Louis-Albert Carvin (1875–1951) was a French sculptor, primarily an animalier.

External links
 Louis-Albert Carvin biography, books, auction results - Art Deco Ceramic Glass Light
 

1875 births
1951 deaths
20th-century French sculptors
French male sculptors